Giorgio Giorgicci or Georgius Georgiceo (1614 – February 1660) was a Roman Catholic prelate who served as Bishop of Krk (1653–1660) and Bishop of Nona (1649–1653).

Biography
Giorgio Giorgicci was born in Spalati in 1614.
On 21 June 1649, he was appointed during the papacy of Pope Innocent X as Bishop of Nona.
On 8 September 1652, he was consecrated bishop by Marcantonio Franciotti, Cardinal-Priest of Santa Maria della Pace, with Giovanni Alfonso Puccinelli, Archbishop of Manfredonia, and Patrizio Donati, Bishop Emeritus of Minori serving as co-consecrators. 
On 22 September 1653, he was appointed during the papacy of Pope Innocent X as Bishop of Krk.
He served as Bishop of Krk until his death in February 1660. 

While bishop, he was the principal co-consecrator of Baldassarre Bonifazio, Bishop of Capodistria (1653); and Francesco de Andreis, Bishop of Nona (1653).

References 

17th-century Roman Catholic bishops in Croatia
Bishops appointed by Pope Innocent X
1614 births
1660 deaths